The Teduray are a Filipino ethnic group. They speak the Tiruray language. There were 103,139 of them in 2010. Their name may have come from words tew, meaning people, and duray, referring to a small bamboo hook and a line used for fishing.

The Tiruray (Teduray) culture was studied at length in the 1960s by anthropologist Stuart A. Schlegel. Schlegel spent two years as a participant/observer among a group who lived in and was sustained by the rainforest. He was profoundly moved by the egalitarian society he witnessed, and went on to write several books and papers on the subject, including Wisdom of the Rainforest: The Spiritual Journey of an Anthropologist.

Ancestral land 
The Teduray ancestral homeland is considered sacred. The Teduray, together with the indigenous Lambangian people, originate from the Agusan, Davao and Lanao regions, the province of Bukidnon, and in the cities of Davao and Zamboanga. The Teduray, Lambiangan, and Manobo have jointly applied for recognition of their ancestral domain covering 289,268 hectares of land comprising the municipalities of Upi, South Upi, Ampatuan, Shariff Aguak, Datu Unsay, Datu Saudi, Guindulungan, Talayan, and Datu Odin Sinsuat in Maguindanao Province and portions of Esperanza, Lebak, Bagumbayan, Senator Ninoy Aquino, Kalamansig, and Palimbang in Sultan Kudarat Province and the city of Cotabato where the indigenous groups are predominantly situated.

Teduray indigenous religion

Immortals

Tulus: referred as the Great Spirit, who was neither male nor female and created all things, including the forest, those that we see (such as humans), and those that we can't see (such as spirits) from mud. Created and re-created humans four times, first due to the non-existence of humans, second due to birthing issues, the third due to Lageay Lengkuos's initiation of the ascending of mankind into the Great Spirit's realm which resulted into the absence of humans on earth, and the last due to another initiation of mankind's ascending to the sky world which had the same effect of leaving the earth devoid of humans. Another name for Meketefu, but also a general term used to apply to the highest deity in each of the layers of the upper regions
Minaden: creator of mankind, which was made from mud. Creator of the earth put at the middle of daylight. Taught humans to wear clothes and speak new dialects. Her house welcomes living women who managed to arrive in the upper most level of the upper worlds.
Meketefu: the unapproachable brother of Minaden. Also called Tulus. Corrected the sexual organs and noses of mankind. Gave one group of people the monkey clothing which can turn anyone into monkeys, while giving another group bows and arrows.
Monkey Leader: also called Little Monkey, he is a cultural hero who went to Tulus to intercede for his people, which resulted in his group ascending the upper regions. Two non-believers of his group were left on earth, but he returned to give them earth and a piece of iron which extended from earth to sky. This piece of iron became the source of all iron
Biaku: the magic bird who originally provided clothes and beads to mankind. But when a neighboring people attacked the Teduray, Biaku fled
Metiatil: married to the hero Lageay Lengkuos; also referred to as Metiyatil Kenogan
Lageay Lengkuos: the greatest of heroes and a shaman (beliyan) who made the earth and forests; the only one who could pass the magnet stone in the straight between the big and little oceans; inverted the directions where east became west, inverted the path of the sun, and made the water into land and land into water; also known as Lagey Lengkuwos, was impressed by the beauty of the region where the Great Spirit lives, and decided to take up his people there to live with the Great Spirit, leaving earth without humans
Matelegu Ferendam: son of Lageay Lengkuos and Metiatil, although in some tales, he was instead birthed by Metiatil's necklace, Tafay Lalawan, instead
Lageay Seboten: a poor breechcloth-wearing culture hero who carried a basket of camote and followed by his pregnant wife; made a sacred pilgrimage to Tulus, and awaits the arrival of a Teduray who would lead his people
Mo-Sugala: father of Legeay Seboten who did not follow his son; loved to hunt with his dogs, and became a man-eater living in a cave
Saitan: evil spirits brought by foreign priests
Guru: leader of the Bolbol, a group of humans who can change into birds or whose spirits can fly at night to hunt humans
Damangias: a spirit who would test righteous people by playing tricks on them
Male Beliyan (Shamans)
Endilayag Belalà
Endilayag Kerakam
Lagey Bidek Keroon
Lagey Fegefaden
Lagey Lindib Lugatu 
Lagey Titay Beliyan
Omolegu Ferendam
Female Beliyan (Shamans)
Kenogon Enggulon
Bonggo Solò Delemon
Kenogon Sembuyaya
Kenogon Dayafan
Bonggo Matir Atir
Kenogon Enggerayur
Segoyong: guardians of the classes of natural phenomena; punishes humans to do not show respect and steal their wards; many of them specialize in a class, which can be water, trees, grasses, caves behind waterfalls, land caves, snakes, fire, nunuk trees, deer, and pigs; there were also Segoyang of bamboo, rice, and rattan; caretakers of various aspects of nature
Segoyong of Land Caves: take the form of a feared snake known a humanity's grandparent; cannot be killed for he is the twin of the first people who was banished for playfully roughly with his sibling
Segoyong of Pigs: takes its share of butterflies in the forest; feared during night hunts
Segoyong of Deers: can change humans into deers and man-eaters; feared during night hunts
Segoyong of Sickness: sends sickness to humans because in the early years, humans were not nice to him; talking about him is forbidden and if one should refer to him, a special sign of surrender is conducted
Woman at Bonggo: the woman at Bonggo who gathers the spirits at the land of the dead in the sky; keeps the spirit of the body
Woman beyond Bonggo: the woman beyond Bonggo who keeps the spirit of the umbilical cord
Brother of Tulus: lives in the highest abode in the land of the dead, where those who died in battle reside
Maginalao: beings of the upper regions who can aid someone to go up in the upper worlds without dying, where usually a female aids a person first, followed by her brother; they sometimes come to earth to aid the poor and the suffering
Giant of Chasms: the first one to guard the chasms between the layers of the upper regions; a man-eating giant
Spirit of Lightning and Thunder: advises humans about good and bad, to not tease animals, and to respect elders and ancestors
Spirit Who Turns Earth into Water: advises humans about good and bad, to not tease animals, and to respect elders and ancestors
One Who Forces the Truth
One of Oratory
Settlers of the Mountains: each of the eight layers of the upper regions have eight spirits referred as Settlers of the Mountains; they are four men and four women who are appealed to for pity in order to get to the highest ranking spirit in a layer
Spirit of the Stars: a spirit higher in rank than the Settlers of the Mountains
Spirit of the Umbilical Cord: the woman beside the deity Meketefu (Tulus); hardest to get pity from as the people were once unkind to her
Malang Batunan: a giant who had a huge house; keep the souls of any false shamans from passing through the region of the Great Spirit

Mortals

Flood Couple: after the great flood, a Teduray boy and Dulungan girl survived and married; their offspring who took after their father became the Teduray, while those who took after their mother became the Dulungan, who were later absorbed by the Manobo
Mamalu: an ancestor of the Teduray; the elder sibling who went into the mountains to remain with the native faith; brother of Tambunaoway, ancestor of the Maguindanao
Tambunaoway: an ancestor of the Maguindanao; the younger sibling who went remained in the lowlands and welcomed a foreign faith; brother of Mamalu, ancestor of the Teduray
First Humans: the first couple's child died and from the infant's body, sprouted various plants and lime
Pounding Woman: a woman who was pounding rice one day that she hit the sky with her pestle, which shamed the sky, causing it to go higher
Alagasi: giant humans from western lands who eat smaller humans
Tigangan: giants who take corpses, and transform these corpse into whatever they want to eat
Siring: dwarfs of the nunuk trees

References

Lumad
Ethnic groups in Mindanao